The 2003 World Men's Curling Championship (branded as 2003 Ford World Men's Curling Championship for sponsorship reasons)  was held at the Winnipeg Arena in Winnipeg, Manitoba, Canada from April 5–13, 2003.

Teams

Round robin standings

Round robin results

Draw 1
April 5, 2003 13:00

Draw 2
April 6, 2003 08:00

Draw 3
April 6, 2003 18:00

Draw 4
April 7, 2003 13:00

Draw 5
April 8, 2003 08:00

Draw 6
April 8, 2003 18:00

Draw 7
April 9, 2003 13:00

Draw 8
April 10, 2003 08:00

Draw 9
April 10, 2003 18:00

Playoffs

Brackets

Semi-final
April 12, 2003 08:00

Bronze medal game
April 13, 2003 08:00

Final
April 13, 2003 12:30

Top percentages

References
 

Curling Championship
2003
Curling competitions in Winnipeg
April 2003 sports events in Canada
2003 in Manitoba
International curling competitions hosted by Canada
2000s in Winnipeg